Ecstasy is the fifth studio album by composer Deuter, released in 1979 by Kuckuck Schallplatten.

Track listing

Personnel
Adapted from the Haleakala liner notes.
 Deuter – flute, guitar,  synthesizer, production
 Eckart Rahn – cover art
 Hermann Wernhard – design

Release history

References

External links 
 

1979 albums
Deuter albums
Kuckuck Schallplatten albums